Kristofer Nagel Janson  (May 4, 1841 – November 17, 1917) was a Norwegian poet, author and Unitarian clergyman. Kristofer Janson is commonly recognized as the founder of the Norwegian Unitarian Church.

Background

Kristofer Janson was born in Bergen, Norway. His father, a prominent merchant, was also the American consul. Janson graduated with a degree in theology from the University of Christiania during 1865. Although he had been trained in theology, he was not ordained into the Church of Norway. He traveled extensively in Europe and upon his return to Norway became popular as a teacher and author.

Career
In 1876, Kristofer Janson's three-act drama, Amerikanske fantasier, was issued in Chicago by Skandinaven, which hailed its publication as a red-letter day for Norwegians in America. Both  Rasmus B. Anderson and H. H. Boyesen were subsequently instrumental in arranging a lecture tour of the Norwegian immigrant community in the United States.  Janson came to the United States during September, 1879 at the start of a successful six month lecture tour.

Janson subsequently relocated his family to the United States. His home soon became a cultural center. It was here as Janson's secretary that the future Norwegian author Knut Hamsun got his initial impressions of American cultural life. During this period Janson wrote several novels and short stories often attacking the orthodoxy of the Synod of the Norwegian Evangelical Lutheran Church in America.

Norwegian writer Bjørnstjerne Bjørnson had encouraged Janson to go to the United States and become a Unitarian pastor for the Norwegian immigrant settlements. Janson was ordained in a ceremony which took place in 1881 in Third Unitarian Church in Chicago. He was subsequently asked by the American Unitarian Association to serve as minister among Scandinavian settlers in Minnesota.  He founded the Free Christian Church of Minneapolis, later known as the Nazareth Church, and also established the Nora Free Christian Church in Hanska, Minnesota.  He spent his winters serving the Minneapolis church and his summers in Hanska.

In 1893 Janson returned to Norway and introduced Unitarianism to Norway mainly in Oslo. Kristofer Janson is recognized as the historical founder of the Norwegian Unitarian Church (Norwegian: Unitarforbundet Bét Dávid) which was established in 1895.

Selected works

Norske Dikt (1867) 
Fante-Anne: short story (1868)
Marit Skjølte: novel (1868)
Salmer og sange for kirke og hjem (1883)
Fra begge Sider Havet: fortællinger (1890)
Lys og frihed: predikener til alle kirkeaarets Sön- og helligdage (1892)
Foredrag (1894)
Prestekonen: short story (1901)
Bondefortællinger (1908)

Additional reading
Draxen, Nina  Kristofer Janson in America (Norwegian-American Historical Association. Authors Series. 1976)
Hansen, Carl G. O. My Minneapolis. (Minneapolis, MN: Standard Press, 1956)
Sveino, Per Kristofer Janson and his American Experience (Oslo. 1971)

References

External links

Kristofer Janson's beginning ministry
Kristof Janson at the Internet Archive
Kristofer Janson at the Minnesota Historical Society
Kristofer Janson and the reform of the Norwegian language 

Works in English
 
 
The spell-bound fiddler
The religious views of Bjørnson and Ibsen 
A history of the Norwegians of Illinois: "Our Ancestors" by Kristofer Janson, pp. 17–32.

Online book
My Minneapolis: Nasjonalbiblioteket 
28. Kristofer Janson and Knut Hamsun

Adaptation of Fante-Anne
Fante-Anne: 1920 film by Rasmus Breistein 

Adaptation of Marit Skjølte
Brudeferden I Hardanger: 1926 film by Rasmus Breistein 

Adaptation of Prestekonen
The Parson's Widow: 1920 film by Carl Theodor Dreyer
 

1841 births
1917 deaths
American Unitarians
Norwegian emigrants to the United States
Clergy from Bergen